Korean War Veterans Plaza is a memorial plaza in Brooklyn, New York City, at Fulton and Tillary streets (Cadman Plaza). The plaza features a gate and flagstaff, cast in 1992 and dedicated on November 11 (Veterans Day) of that year. The park is named in honor of the Brooklyn military personnel who served in the Korean War.

See also
 List of Korean War memorials

References

External links
 

1992 establishments in New York City
Downtown Brooklyn
Korean War memorials and cemeteries
Monuments and memorials in Brooklyn
Cultural infrastructure completed in 1992